Ennucula is a genus of marine bivalves that inhabit all the world's oceans. They are placed in the family Nuculidae. Ennucula fossils have been in strata deposited 15.6-15.4 million years ago.

Species

Ennucula aegeensis Forbes, 1844
Ennucula agujana Dall, 1908
Ennucula astricta Iredale, 1931
Ennucula bathybia Prashad, 1932
Ennucula bengalensis E. A. Smith, 1895
Ennucula cardara Dall, 1916
Ennucula colombiana Dall, 1908 
Ennucula convexa  G. B. Sowerby I, 1833
Ennucula corbuloides Seguenza, 1877
Ennucula corticata Møller, 1842
Ennucula cumingii Hinds, 1843
Ennucula dalmasi Dautzenberg, 1900
Ennucula dautzenbergi Prashad, 1932
Ennucula decipiens Philippi, 1844
Ennucula definita Iredale, 1939
Ennucula delphinodonta Mighels & C. B. Adams, 1842
Ennucula dilecta E. A. Smith, 1891
Ennucula elongata Rhind & Allen, 1992
Ennucula eltanini Dell, 1990
Ennucula faba F.-S. Xu, 1999
Ennucula georgiana Dell, 1964
Ennucula granulosa  Verrill, 1884 
Ennucula grayi d'Orbigny, 1846
Ennucula interflucta Marincovich, 1973
Ennucula jaeckeli M. Huber, 2010
Ennucula layardii A. Adams, 1856 
Ennucula linki Dall, 1916
Ennucula mareana Weisbord, 1964
Ennucula mirifica Dall, 1907
Ennucula niponica E. A. Smith, 1885
Ennucula obliqua Lamarck, 1819
Ennucula oliva Kilburn, 1999
Ennucula orekta Iredale, 1939
Ennucula pachydonta Prashad, 1932
Ennucula panamina Dall, 1908
Ennucula perforata Rhind & Allen, 1992
Ennucula pernambucensis E. A. Smith, 1885
Ennucula privigna Iredale, 1939
Ennucula puelcha d'Orbigny, 1842
Ennucula romboides Scarlato, 1981
Ennucula sansibarensis Thiele, 1931
Ennucula siberutensis Thiele, 1931
Ennucula similis Rhind & Allen, 1992
Ennucula strangei A. Adams, 1856
Ennucula strangeiformis Dell, 1956
Ennucula superba Hedley, 1902
Ennucula taeniolata Dall, 1908
Ennucula tenuis Montagu, 1808

References

Nuculidae
Bivalve genera